Eucoelophysis (meaning "true hollow form") is a genus of silesaurid dinosauriform from the Late Triassic (Norian) period Chinle Formation of New Mexico. It was assumed to be a coelophysid upon description, but a study by Nesbitt et al. found that it was actually a close relative of Silesaurus, which was independently supported by Ezcurra (2006), who found it to be the sister group to Dinosauria, and Silesaurus as the next most basal taxon.

However, the relationships of Silesaurus are uncertain. Dzik found it to be a basal dinosauriform (the group of archosaurs from which the dinosaurs evolved), but did not rule out the possibility that it represents a primitive ornithischian.

References

External links
William Parker's reaction to Ezcurra (2006) , from the Dinosaur Mailing List.

Silesaurids
Late Triassic archosaurs of North America
Taxa named by Spencer G. Lucas
Fossil taxa described in 1999